The Bahia wagtail-tyrant (Stigmatura bahiae) is a South American species of bird in the family Tyrannidae. The Bahia wagtail-tyrant is found in southeast Brazil.

It is typically found in dense, brushy, and low stature caatinga below about 600 meters.

References

Stigmatura
Birds of Brazil
Birds described in 1926